Microphysogobio chinssuensis is a species of cyprinid fish endemic to the upper reaches of the Yangtze River.

References

Microphysogobio
Taxa named by John Treadwell Nichols
Fish described in 1926